The following is a list of notable deaths in February 2000.

Entries for each day are listed alphabetically by surname. A typical entry lists information in the following sequence:
 Name, age, country of citizenship at birth, subsequent country of citizenship (if applicable), reason for notability, cause of death (if known), and reference.

February 2000

1
Pablito Calvo, 51, Spanish actor (Miracle of Marcelino), brain aneurysm.
Pina Cei, 95, Italian actress.
Frederick Vanderbilt Field, 94, American political activist.
Erik Holmberg, 91, Swedish astronomer and cosmologist.
Art Hoppe, 74, American newspaper columnist, lung cancer.
Hans Hügi, 70, Swiss football player.
Khunkar-Pasha Israpilov, 32, Chechen separatist, killed in action.
Anker Kihle, 82, Norwegian footballer.
Peter Levi, 68, British poet, jesuit priest and scholar.
Henry Mann, 94, American professor of mathematics and statistics.
Thomas J. McHugh, 80, American Sergeant Major of the Marine Corps (1962-1965).
James V. Neel, 84, American geneticist.
Dick Rathmann, 74, American racecar driver.

2
Harry K. Cull, 88, American politician.
Sheikh Abdul Latif, 71, Indian football player.
Teruki Miyamoto, 59, Japanese football player and manager, heart failure.
Francis Stuart, 97, Irish writer.
Li Zhun, 71, Chinese novelist.

3
Guillermo Estévez Boero, 69, Argentine student activist, lawyer and politician, leukemia.
Bonnie Cashin, American pioneer designer of sportswear.
Don Gallinger, 74, Canadian ice hockey player.
Richard Kleindienst, 76, American politician and U.S. Attorney General during the Watergate scandal, lung cancer.
Yuriy Lituyev, 74, Soviet athlete and Olympic medalist.
Pierre Plantard, 79, French draughtsman and impostor.
Alla Rakha, 80, Indian tabla player, heart attack.

4
Carl Albert, 91, American lawyer, politician and Speaker of the United States House of Representatives.
Joachim-Ernst Berendt, 77, German music journalist.
Edgar Bowers, 75, American poet.
Rodrigo Hernan Lloreda Caicedo, 57, Colombian lawyer and politician.
Doris Coley, 58, American singer of The Shirelles, breast cancer.
James C. Green, 78, American politician.
Peter Rajniak, 46, Slovak basketball player.
Ronald Robertson, 62, American figure skater, AIDS-related complications.
Roy Stephenson, 67, English football player.
Johnny Vincent, 72, American record producer.

5
Claude Autant-Lara, 98, French film director and politician.
Ward Cornell, 75, Canadian radio/TV broadcaster & educator, pulmonary emphysema.
G. E. M. de Ste. Croix, 89, British ancient historian.
Pablo Elvira, 62, Puerto Rican baritone.
José García Hernández, 84, Spanish jurist and politician.
Todd Karns, 79, American actor (It's a Wonderful Life), cancer.
George Koltanowski, 96, Belgian-American chess master, promoter, and writer.
T. G. Lingappa, 72, Indian film score composer.
Barbara Pentland, 88, Canadian composer.
Hidetoki Takahashi, 83, Japanese football player and manager, pneumonia.
Tuffy Thompson, 85, American gridiron football player.
Göran Tunström, 62, Swedish author, lung cancer.
Gwendolyn Watts, 67, English actress, heart attack.

6
Derroll Adams, 74, American folk musician.
Sven Aspling, 87, Swedish social democrat politician.
Sándor Balogh, 79, Hungarian football player and coach.
Gus Johnson, 86, American swing drummer.
Klaus Wagner, 89, German mathematician.
Steve Waller, 48, American musician, liver problems.
Phil Walters, 83, American racing driver.

7
Big Pun, 28, American rapper, heart attack.
Pavle Bulatović, 51, Yugoslav politician.
Stewart Farrar, 83, English screenwriter, novelist and Wiccan priest.
Doug Henning, 52, Canadian magician, illusionist and escape artist, cancer.
Muhammad Munawwar Mirza, 77, Pakistani writer, histrorian and intellectual.
Shiho Niiyama, 29, Japanese voice actress, leukemia.
Dave Peverett, 56, English singer and musician of Foghat, cancer.
Wilfred Cantwell Smith, 83, Canadian Islamicist and Presbyterian minister.
Mildred Wiley, 98, American high jumper and Olympic medalist.

8
Sid Abel, 81, Canadian ice hockey player.
Aryanandi, 92, Indian Jain monk.
Mario Capio, 75, Italian Olympic sailor.
Bob Collins, 57, American broadcaster.
Carlos Cores, 76, Argentine film actor, and film director, heart attack.
Edna Griffin, 90, American civil rights pioneer and activist.
Sidney Hayers, 78, British film and television director, writer and producer, cancer.
Ion Gheorghe Maurer, 97, Pomanian politician, Prime Minister of Romania (1958-1961).
Derrick Thomas, 33, American football player (Kansas City Chiefs) and member of the Pro Football Hall of Fame, pulmonary embolism.

9
Yevgeni Andreyev, 73, Soviet Air Force colonel and balloonist.
Steve Furness, 49, American football player, heart attack.
Beau Jack, 78, American boxer, Parkinson's disease.
Lenore Kight, 88, American swimmer and Olympian.
Shobhna Samarth, 83, Indian film actress, director and producer, cancer.
Buck Young, 79, American actor.

10
Androniqi Zengo Antoniu, 86, Albanian painter.
Igor Bensen, 82, Russian-American engineer, Parkinson's disease.
John Garlington, 53, American football player, drowned.
Elvira Gascón, 88, Spanish painter, drafter, and engraver.
George Jackson, 42, American movie producer, stroke.
Gene Lambert, 78, American baseball player.
Ji Pengfei, 90, Chinese politician, suicide.
Jim Varney, 50, American actor (Ernest Saves Christmas, Toy Story, The Beverly Hillbillies), lung cancer.
Andrzej Zakrzewski, 58, Polish historian, politician, and journalist.

11
Jacqueline Auriol, 82, French aviator who set several world speed records.
Gordon Lockhart Bennett, 87, Canadian politician, Lieutenant Governor of Prince Edward Island.
Bernat Capó, 80, Spanish racing cyclist.
Ruth Volkl Cardoso, 66, Brazilian chess player.
Lord Kitchener, 77, Trinidadian calypsonian, multiple myeloma.
Martin Theodore Orne, 72, Austrian-American professor of psychiatry and psychology.
Louis Pelletier, 93, American dramatist, screenwriter, and playwright.
Elangbam Nilakanta Singh, 72, Indian poet and critic.
Roger Vadim, 72, French film director, lymphoma.
Bernardino Zapponi, 72, Italian novelist and screenwriter.

12
Newt Arnold, 77, American film director (Bloodsport), leukemia.
Dominic Bruce, 84, British Royal Air Force officer and Colditz Castle escapee during World War II.
Screamin' Jay Hawkins, 70, American musician, surgical complications.
Tom Landry, 75, American football coach (Dallas Cowboys) and member of the Pro Football Hall of Fame, leukemia.
Andy Lewis, 33, Australian bass guitarist, suicide.
John London, 58, American musician and songwriter.
August Meuleman, 93, Belgian cyclist.
Oliver, 54, American pop singer.
Charles M. Schulz, 77, American comic strip artist (Peanuts), colon cancer.
Juan Carlos Thorry, 91, Argentine film actor, tango musician and director.

13
John Wesley Blassingame, 59, American historian specializing in American slavery.
James Cooke Brown, 78, American sociologist and science fiction author.
John Cameron, 85, Jamaican cricket player.
J. Robert Harris, 74, American composer.
F. X. Martin, 77, Irish priest and historian.
Thelma Parr, 93, American actress.

14
Tony Bettenhausen, Jr., 48, American car racing driver and team owner, plane crash.
Tertius Bosch, 33, South African cricketer, Guillain–Barré syndrome.
Erika Dunkelmann, 86, German film and television actress.
Jimmy Martin, 75, Irish professional golfer.
Antun Nalis, 89, Croatian actor.
Vitamin Smith, 76, American gridiron football player.
Walter Zinn, 93, Canadian-American nuclear physicist who worked at the Manhattan Project.

15
Shamsul Huda Chaudhury, 79, Bangladeshi politician.
Dilip Dhawan, 45, Indian actor, heart attack.
Angus MacLean, 85, Canadian politician and farmer.
Bob Ramazzotti, 83, American baseball player.
Vladimir Utkin, 76, Soviet and Russian engineer and rocket scientist.

16
Wayne Blackburn, 85, American baseball coach.
Soup Campbell, 84, American baseball player.
Veronica Cooper, 86, American actress.
Marceline Day, 91, American actress.
Mohammed Fawzi, 84, Egyptian general and politician.
Carlos Chagas Filho, 89, Brazilian physician, biologist and scientist.
Fung Fung, 83, Hong Kong actor.
Lila Kedrova, 90, Russian-French actress (Zorba the Greek, Torn Curtain, A High Wind in Jamaica), Oscar winner (1965), pneumonia.
B. S. Kesavan, 90, Indian librarian.
Louis-Georges Niels, 80, Belgian bobsledder and Olympic silver medalist.
Bill Riley, 78, American ice hockey player.
Karsten Solheim, 88, Norwegian-American golf club designer (PING) and businessman, Parkinson's disease.

17
Iffat Al-Thunayan, Saudi princess and wife of King Faisal.
William Anderson, 84, Canadian officer.
Selina Chönz, 89, Swiss children's author.
Turkey Tyson, 85, American baseball player.
Miles White, 85, American costume designer of Broadway musicals.

18
Henry Åkervall, 62, Canadian ice hockey player.
Yalavarthi Naveen Babu, 35, Indian revolutionary group leader, killed in firefight with police.
Lefty Hoerst, 82, American baseball player.
Nader Naderpour, 70, Iranian-American poet.
Will, 72, Belgian comics artist.

19
Marin Goleminov, 91, Bulgarian musician.
Josef Herman, 89, Polish-British painter.
Friedensreich Hundertwasser, 71, Austrian artist, heart attack.
Amanda Ledesma, 88, Argentine film actress and singer.
George Lenczowski, 85, Russian-American lawyer, diplomat, and academic.
Kenneth L. Maddy, 65, American politician.
Djidingar Dono Ngardoum, 72, Chadian politician, Prime Minister (1982).
George Roussos, 84, American comic book artist (Fantastic Four, Batman, Avengers).
Anatoly Sobchak, 62, Russian politician and mentor of Vladimir Putin and Dmitry Medvedev, heart attack.
Jim Wulff, 63, American gridiron football player (Washington Redskins).

20
Elliot Caplin, 86, American  comic strip writer.
Jean Dotto, 71, French racing cyclist.
Jean-Pierre Grenier, 85, French actor, theatre director and screenwriter.
Bernard Hickman, 88, American basketball player and coach.
Oswald Lange, 87, German-American aerospace engineer and member of the "von Braun rocket group".
Otello Martelli, 97, Italian cinematographer.
Edmund McNamara, 79, American police officer and gridiron football player.

21
Noel Annan, Baron Annan, 83, British military intelligence officer and academic.
Olena Apanovych, 80, Ukrainian historian.
Violet Archer, 86, Canadian musician and composer.
Chao Tzee Cheng, 65, Hong Kong-Singaporean forensic pathologist.
Clifton Daniel, 87, American newspaper managing editor, stroke.
Antonio Díaz-Miguel, 65, Spanish basketball player and coach, cancer.
Radhamohan Gadanayak, 88, Indian poet.
Constance Cummings John, 82, Sierra Leonean educationist and politician.
Kenneth Nichols, 92, United States Army officer and civil engineer, respiratory failure.

22
Fernando Buesa, 53, Spanish politician, terrorist attack.
John Kellogg, 83, American actor, Alzheimer's disease.
Arkady Khait, 61, Russian writer, satirist and screenwriter, leukemia.
Ernest Lough, 88, English boy soprano.
Alexandre Marc, 96, French writer and philosopher.
Maurine Brown Neuberger, 93, American politician.
Michelle O'Keefe, 18, American college student and aspiring actress, gunshot wounds.
Raphaël Pujazon, 82, French athlete and Olympian.

23
John Nevill, 5th Marquess of Abergavenny, 85, British aristocrat.
Dennis Evans, 69, English football player.
Albrecht Goes, 91, German writer and theologian.
Nikolay Gulyayev, 84, Russian football player and football coach.
Ofra Haza, 42, Israeli singer, AIDS-related pneumonia.
Stanley Matthews, 85, English football player.
Joseph V. Perry, 69, American actor, diabetes.
B. Rachaiah, 77, Indian politician.
Terry Melvin Sims, 58, American murderer, execution by lethal injection.

24
Betty Lou Beets, 62, American murderer, execution by lethal injection.
Michael Colvin, 67, British politician.
Franciszek Kamiński, 97, Polish politician and military commander during World War II.
Rosalind Keith, 83, American film actress and singer.
Bernard Opper, 84, American basketball player.
Béla Szekeres, 62, Hungarian middle distance runner and Olympian.
Boris Mikhaylovich Zaytsev, 62, Soviet ice hockey player.

25
Pyotr Breus, 72, Russian water polo player.
Victoria Climbié, 8, Ivorian girl, prolonged child abuse.
Elaine Gordon, 69, American politician, non-Hodgkin lymphoma.
Doris Löve, 82, Swedish botanist.
Tom McEllistrim, 74, Irish Fianna Fáil politician.
Sishayi Nxumalo, 64, Swazi politician, traffic collision.
Kuthiravattam Pappu, 62, Indian actor, cardiac arrest.
Culley Rikard, 85, American baseball player.
Aleksandar Živković, 87, Croatian football player.

26
Casimiro Montenegro Filho, 95, Brazilian Air Force officer.
Franz Fuchs, 50, Austrian terrorist, suicide.
Raosaheb Gogte, 83, Indian industrialist, philanthropist and educationist.
Louisa Matthíasdóttir, 83, Icelandic-American painter.
Giovanna of Savoy, 92, Italian princess of the House of Savoy, heart failure.
George L. Street III, 86, United States Navy submarine commander during World War II and Medal of Honor recipient.

27
Larry Adams, 63, American jockey.
Jan Adele, 64, Australian actress and vaudeville entertainer.
Casimiro Berenguer, 90, Puerto Rican nationalist.
Eduardo Copello, 74, Argentine racing driver.
George Duning, 92, American musician, and film composer.
James Stanley Hey, 90, English physicist and radio astronomer.
Aubrey Eugene Robinson, Jr., 77, American jurist and judge, heart attack.

28
Kariel Gardosh, 78, Israeli cartoonist and illustrator ("Dosh").
John N. Irwin, II, 86, American diplomat and attorney.
Dalsukh Dahyabhai Malvania, 89, Indian scholar, writer and philosopher.
Jean Vallette d'Osia, 101, French officer and French Resistance member during WWII.
Janet Reed, 83, American ballerina and ballet mistress.
George Siravo, 83, American composer, arranger, and musician.

29
Dennis Danell, 38, American musician (Social Distortion), cerebral aneurysm.
Pierre Dumas, French doctor and drug test pioneer.
Karen Hoff, 78, Danish sprint canoeist and Olympic champion.
Hidehiko Matsumoto, 73, Japanese jazz saxophonist and bandleader.
Nikita Moiseyev, 82, Soviet and Russian mathematician and academic.
Sardar Muhammad Arif Nakai, 70, Pakistani politician.
Kayla Rolland, 6, American school shooting victim, cardiac arrest from shooting.

References 

2000-02
 02